Agraylea is a genus of microcaddisflies in the family Hydroptilidae. There are more than 20 described species in Agraylea.

Species
These 25 species belong to the genus Agraylea:

 Agraylea argyricola (Kolenati, 1848)
 Agraylea cognatella McLachlan, 1880
 Agraylea costella Ross, 1941
 Agraylea dactylina
 Agraylea drosima Navas, 1917
 Agraylea galaica Gonzalez & Malicky, 1980
 Agraylea heterocera Navás, 1917
 Agraylea insularis (Hagen, 1865)
 Agraylea laerma Malicky, 1976
 Agraylea marinkovicae Malicky, 1977
 Agraylea militsa Malicky, 1992
 Agraylea multipunctata Curtis, 1834 (salt and pepper microcaddis)
 Agraylea pallicornis (Eaton, 1873)
 Agraylea saltesea Ross, 1938
 Agraylea sexmaculata Curtis, 1834
 Agraylea tauri Jacquemart, 1965
 Agraylea teldanica Botosaneanu, 1974
 Agraylea vilnensis Raciecka, 1937
 † Agraylea cretaria Botosaneanu, 1995
 † Agraylea cumsacculo Wichard, 2013
 † Agraylea electroscientia Melnitsky & Ivanov, 2010
 † Agraylea glaesaria Wichard, 2013
 † Agraylea lentiginosa Botosaneanu & al., 1998
 † Agraylea parva Wichard & Bölling, 2000
 † Agraylea spathifera Ulmer, 1912

References

Further reading

External links

 

Hydroptilidae
Articles created by Qbugbot